Hypsopygia orthogramma is a species of snout moth in the genus Hypsopygia. It was described by Hiroshi Inoue in 1960. It is found in Korea and Japan.

With a wingspan of 40 mm it is the largest species in the genus Hypsopygia.

References

Moths described in 1960
Pyralini
Moths of Japan